Chowmuhani Government S.A College is a public college in Begumganj Upazila, Noakhali District, Bangladesh established in 1943. The college is affiliated with National University.

Choumuhany College is a prominent educational institution of Noakhali district after Noakhali Science & Technology University, Abdul Malek Ukil Medical College, Noakhali and Noakhali Government College. Every year a huge number of students get chance in different prominent university after complete their Higher Secondary School Certificate (HSC) examination from here.

Notable alumni
 Prof. Dr. Naiyyum Choudhury, Founding Chairman of the Bangladesh Atomic Energy Regulatory Authority

References

External links
 Official web

Colleges in Noakhali District
1943 establishments in India
Educational institutions established in 1943
Begumganj Upazila